František Rajtoral (12 March 1986 – ca. 23 April 2017) was a Czech professional footballer who played as a right winger or right-back. He was best known for his stint at Viktoria Plzeň. He was a member of the Czech Republic national team.

He won the Czech Cup with Viktoria Plzeň in 2010. Further trophies he won with the club include the Gambrinus Liga twice and the Czech Supercup.

On 29 February 2012, Rajtoral earned his first cap for the senior team of his country in the 1–1 draw with Ireland in a friendly match.

Rajtoral was described as "one of the best attacking right-wingers in the Czech Republic" by journalist Mark Smith.

Club career

Early career
Rajtoral played for Příbram for a season before joining Baník Ostrava, with whom he signed a three-year contract in 2005. He made his debut in European competitions in the 2005–06 UEFA Cup while playing for Ostrava.

Viktoria Plzeň
He joined Viktoria Plzeň from Ostrava in 2009 in a deal which involved the exchange of striker Adam Varadi in the other direction.

Rajtoral played in the inaugural Czech Supercup in 2010 against Sparta Prague, being one of two players to be sent off as his team lost the match. He scored his first goal of the 2010–11 season in October 2010 against Mladá Boleslav, but his team lost the game 4–3.

Rajtoral played the second half of the 2011 Czech Supercup, a match which Plzeň won on penalties against Mladá Boleslav. He replaced Marián Čišovský in the 46th minute, in a match which finished 1–1.

Hannover 96
In January 2014 Rajtoral joined German Bundesliga club Hannover 96 on loan for the remainder of the season with an option to make the transfer permanent. Hannover passed on that option though and Rajtoral returned to Plzeň for the start of the new season.

Gaziantepspor and death
Rajtoral joined Gaziantepspor in August 2016. He was found dead in his home in Gaziantep, Turkey, on 23 April 2017 after not turning up for a training session with his team in the morning. His neighbors contacted the local authorities in concern when they found his apartment door locked from the inside with no response. Upon investigation local authorities announced that Rajtoral had committed suicide by hanging.

International career
Rajtoral took part in the 2007 UEFA European Under-21 Championship. He played in all three of his nation's matches at the tournament.

He made his senior debut on 29 February 2012 in a friendly match against Ireland, a game which finished 1–1. In May 2012 he was named in his country's 23-man squad for the Euro 2012 tournament.

Personal life
Rajtoral was born in Příbram, where he made his professional breakthrough in Czech First League with Marila Příbram. In 2008 he was diagnosed with chronic fatigue syndrome and underwent treatment for several months. His disease recurred again in 2014.

On 24 April 2017, he did not participate in training sessions for Gaziantepspor. He was found dead in his apartment by police after committing suicide on Sunday. It has been hypothesized that the breakup with his longtime girlfriend in 2016 and the departure of his friend Daniel Kolář in February 2017 may have worsened his psychological situation. Coincidentally, in a month, his death was followed by that of David Bystroň, a former teammate and defensive partner at Viktoria Plzeň, who committed a similar suicide.

Career statistics

Honours
Viktoria Plzeň
 Czech Cup: 2010
 Gambrinus liga: 2010–11, 2012–13, 2014–15,  2015–16
 Czech Supercup: 2011, 2015

References

External links
 
 
 Guardian Football
 

1986 births
2017 suicides
2017 deaths
Sportspeople from Příbram
Czech footballers
Czech Republic youth international footballers
Czech Republic under-21 international footballers
Czech Republic international footballers
Czech First League players
Bundesliga players
Süper Lig players
1. FK Příbram players
FC Baník Ostrava players
FC Viktoria Plzeň players
Hannover 96 players
Gaziantepspor footballers
UEFA Euro 2012 players
Association football defenders
Association football midfielders
Suicides by hanging in Turkey
Czech expatriate sportspeople in Turkey
Czech expatriate sportspeople in Germany
Expatriate footballers in Germany
Expatriate footballers in Turkey